Alex O. Solis (born March 25, 1964) is a jockey based in the United States. He lives in Glendora, California and rides predominantly in Southern California. He got his big break and his first gained national prominence when he won the 1986 Preakness Stakes with Snow Chief. In 2014, he was elected to the horse racing hall of fame and on January 1, 2015, became the 29th jockey in North American history to have 5,000 wins.

Background
He grew up poor on a farm in San Carlos, Panama, where he spent a lot of time around horses. He visited a race track for the first time when he was 13 and by 14 was enrolled in a jockey school. After two years in jockey school and after becoming the leading apprentice jockey in Panama, he came to the United States in 1982 with only $700 and did not speak English.  He began his American career at Calder Race Course in Florida, where he quickly achieved racing success and was given the nickname El Maestrito ("The Little Master"). He told interviewers that he worked to improve his English by watching television and listening to music.

Racing career

Solis' first rode in the Kentucky Derby in 1983 on a longshot named Current Hope, and did not place in the money. He rode the Derby again in 1986 on Snow Chief, who had won the Santa Anita Derby and was the morning line favorite, but again finished well back. The horse and rider went on to with the Preakness Stakes that year, marking Solis' only win to date in an American Triple Crown race.  He was third in the 1991 Derby on Mane Minister, and also third in the Belmont Stakes on the same horse.  Solis finished second in the Kentucky Derby and third in the Preakness with Captain Bodgit in 1997, second in the Derby with Victory Gallop in 1998 and second in both the Derby and the Belmont with Aptitude in 2000.  His first Breeders' Cup win was the 2000 Breeders' Cup Sprint on Kona Gold. He won two Breeders' Cup races in 2003 with Johar (who finished in a dead heat) in the Breeders' Cup Turf, and the Breeders' Cup Classic on Pleasantly Perfect, both trained by Richard Mandella. He ended 2003 ranked fourth nationally in purse earnings with a career-best $16,304,252.

He won the 2004 Dubai World Cup on Pleasantly Perfect, and the 2006 Santa Anita Derby aboard Brother Derek.  In 2010, Solis rode Mandurah to a new world record for a mile on the turf at Monmouth Park,  1:31.23, breaking the previous record of 1:31.41 set by Mister Light in 2005 at Gulfstream Park.

His son, Alex Solis II, born in 1984, became a bloodstock agent when he was 20 years old, and owns several racehorses, some of whom his father has ridden in races. In 2009, Solis won the Sham Stakes aboard The Pamplemousse, a horse who was part-owned by Alex II, and in 2012 rode the filly Irish Mission to victory on the turf at Woodbine to capture the Breeders' Stakes. The win marked his first ever victory in a Canadian Triple Crown race.

Solis' most serious riding injury was a broken back in 2004, when he was out eight months following surgery that included two titanium rods and eight screws.  He has also had broken knees, fingers, does, ribs and his left leg. He was one of the jockeys featured in Animal Planet's 2009 reality documentary, Jockeys, something he enjoyed doing, but felt that the end product did not accurately portray the life of a jockey.  He commented, " They put more drama–or a different type of drama–into horse racing. The sport is already full of drama with all the hardships that jockeys have to go through, such as breaking bones. So they didn't need to add more drama."

In 2002, Solis was inducted in the Calder Race Course Hall of Fame. He was elected to the National Museum of Racing's Hall of Fame in 2014 and earned his 5,000th North American racing win at Santa Anita Park on January 1, 2015, becoming only the 29th jockey in North American history to do so.  His 5,000th win came on a horse named Lutine Belle, owned partly by trainer Jerry Hollendorfer and part-owned by Solis' son Alex II.

On April 30, 2015, Solis was appointed by Governor Jerry Brown to the California Horse Racing Board to fill the seat vacated by Bo Derek. His appointment must be confirmed by the State Senate. He plans to continue riding horses while serving on the board.

On November 26, 2017, he announced his retirement from riding horses.

Alex Solis has a son named Austin who is also a jockey.

Year-end charts

See also
List of jockeys
Thoroughbred horse racing

References

External links 
 Alex Solis at the NTRA
Stories on Solis in the Los Angeles Times

American jockeys
Panamanian jockeys
1964 births
Living people
Panamanian emigrants to the United States
Sportspeople from Panama City
People from Glendora, California
Sportspeople from Los Angeles County, California